The 2010 BNP Paribas Open was a tennis tournament played at Indian Wells, California in March 2010. It was the 37th edition of the men's event (22nd for the women), known this year as the BNP Paribas Open, and is classified as an ATP World Tour Masters 1000 event on the 2010 ATP World Tour and a Premier Mandatory event on the 2010 WTA Tour. Both the men's and the women's events took place at the Indian Wells Tennis Garden in Indian Wells, California, United States from March 8 through March 21, 2010.

The year's tournament saw a couple of withdrawals; The women's side saw the draw without the top two rank players with World no. 2 Dinara Safina withdrawing with a recurring back problem and world no. 1 Serena Williams with sister Venus Williams continue their boycott from the tournament since Serena won the event in 2001. The men's side saw the withdrawals of Tommy Haas and Lleyton Hewitt due to hip surgeries. Juan Martín del Potro also withdrew due to a right wrist injury and Fernando González withdrew to aid his country Chile after an earthquake. Stanislas Wawrinka also withdrew due to the birth of his child. Mikhail Youzhny also withdrew.

Finals

Men's singles

 Ivan Ljubičić defeated  Andy Roddick, 7–6(7–3), 7–6(7–5)
It was Ljubicic's first title of the year and 10th of his career. It was his first Masters 1000 title in four finals. He became the first Croatian to win the title.

Women's singles

 Jelena Janković defeated  Caroline Wozniacki, 6–2, 6–4
It was Janković's first title of the year and 12th of her career.

Men's doubles

 Marc López /  Rafael Nadal defeated  Daniel Nestor /  Nenad Zimonjić, 7–6(10–8), 6–3

Women's doubles

 Květa Peschke /  Katarina Srebotnik defeated  Nadia Petrova /  Samantha Stosur, 6–4, 2–6, [10–5]

ATP entrants

Seeds

 Rankings are as of March 1, 2010.

Other entrants
The following players received wildcards into the main draw:
  Robby Ginepri
  Ryan Harrison
  Jesse Levine
  Carlos Moyá
  David Nalbandian

The following player received entry using a protected ranking:
  Mario Ančić

The following players received entry via qualifying:
  Thiago Alves
  Kevin Anderson
  Brian Dabul
  Ramón Delgado
  Stefan Koubek
  Lu Yen-hsun
  Marinko Matosevic
  Ricardo Mello
  Björn Phau
  Bobby Reynolds
  Tim Smyczek
  Rainer Schüttler

Withdrawals
The following notable players withdrew from the tournament:
  José Acasuso
  Juan Martín del Potro (wrist injury)
  Marc Gicquel
  Fernando González (helping with aid in Chile)
  Máximo González
  Tommy Haas (hip surgery)
  Lleyton Hewitt (hip surgery)
  Fabrice Santoro
  Stanislas Wawrinka
  Mikhail Youzhny

WTA entrants

Seeds

 Rankings are as of March 1, 2010.

Other entrants
The following players received wildcards into the main draw:
  Eleni Daniilidou
  Alexa Glatch
  Justine Henin
  Bethanie Mattek-Sands
  Christina McHale
  Alicia Molik
  Tamira Paszek
  Ajla Tomljanović

The following players received entry via qualifying:
  Akgul Amanmuradova
  Elena Baltacha
  Chan Yung-jan
  Edina Gallovits
  Viktoriya Kutuzova
  Michelle Larcher de Brito
  Nuria Llagostera Vives
  Petra Martić
  Shenay Perry
  Tsvetana Pironkova
  Sloane Stephens
  Karolina Šprem

The following player received the lucky loser spot:
  Tamarine Tanasugarn

Withdrawals
The following notable players withdrew from the event:
 Kateryna Bondarenko
 Anna-Lena Grönefeld
 Sania Mirza
 Dinara Safina (back injury)
 Elena Vesnina
 Serena Williams (continue to boycott event since 2001)
 Venus Williams (continue to boycott event since 2001)

References

External links

Association of Tennis Professionals (ATP) tournament profile

 
Bnp Paribas Open
Bnp Paribas Open
2010
Bnp Paribas Open
Bnp Paribas Open

cs:BNP Paribas Open 2010 - muži
pl:BNP Paribas Open 2010 - mężczyźni